Stanley Sue is a clinical psychologist known for his contributions to the field of multicultural studies, specifically in relation to the mental health issues of ethnic minorities and the need for cultural competence in the treatment of psychological disorders. Sue is a Distinguished Professor of Clinical Psychology at Palo Alto University. His work is often cited in discussions about the educational achievements of Asian Americans and the model minority stereotype.

Sue is a co-author of popular textbooks and other titles including Understanding Abnormal Behavior, Essentials of Understanding Abnormal Behavior, and The Mental Health of Asian Americans: Contemporary Issues in Identifying and Treating Mental Problems.

Awards 
Sue has received various prestigious awards throughout his career. These including the American Psychological Association (APA) Distinguished Contributions to Psychology in the Public Interest Award in 1986 and the APA Distinguished Contributions to Research in Public Policy in 1996. Sue received the inaugural Stanley Sue Award for Distinguished Contributions to Diversity in Clinical Psychology in 2003. This award is given annually by the APA to "psychologists who have made remarkable contributions to the understanding of human diversity and whose contributions have significant promise for bettering the human condition, overcoming prejudice, and enhancing the quality of life for humankind."

Other awards include the 1990 Distinguished Contributions to Research in Ethnic Minority Psychology, given by the Society for the Psychological Study of Ethnic Minority Issues (APA Division 45), the 1990 Distinguished Contribution Award from the Asian American Psychological Association, and the1999 Dalmas A. Taylor Award for Pioneering Leadership, Scholarship, and Aggressive Advocacy for Ethnic Minorities.

Biography 
Stanley Sue was born on February 13, 1944, in Portland, Oregon to a family of Chinese Immigrants. He has two older brothers, including Derald Wing Sue, Professor of Psychology and Education at Teachers College, Columbia University, with whom he has collaborate extensively. Sue and his brother Derald are co-founders of the Asian American Psychological Association.

Sue received his B.S. degree in area of Psychology at the University of Oregon in 1966, He subsequently attended graduate school at the University of California, Los Angeles (UCLA) where he obtained a M.A. degree in 1967 and a Ph.D. in Clinical Psychology in 1971. Sue's doctoral dissertation on modes of reducing cognitive dissonance was conducted under the supervision of Bertram Raven. Sue was a member of the faculty at the University of Washington, UCLA, and the University of California, Davis prior to joining the faculty at Palo Alto University in 2011.

Research 
Sue's work is dedicated to ethnic minorities and the difficulties they face in receiving treatment for mental health issues and how they may struggle in society due to discrimination and prejudice. Sue has raised awareness of these issues and has brought his research to medical committees to advocate for change.

In pioneering research, Sue and his colleague Herman McKinney followed over 14,000 clients in 17 community mental health agencies located in King County in the State of Washington. The researchers observed out that Black clients receiving treatment tended to drop out much earlier than White clients. Sue offered ideas on how to properly address this issue while raising awareness that the situation was even happening in the first place. Sue also brought to light that there may be a lack of transparency and connection in how a therapist works with a minority client. In doing so, Sue identified holes that were present in the field of psychology regarding the treatment of ethnic minorities and addressed the problem by advocating for multicultural competence in mental health care.

References

External links 

 Faculty home page

Living people
1944 births
21st-century American psychologists
University of Oregon alumni
University of California, Los Angeles alumni
Palo Alto University faculty
University of California, Davis faculty
20th-century American psychologists